The Torneio Octogonal Rivadavia Correa Meyer was an intercontinental club football tournament held in Brazil in 1953. It was organised by the Brazilian Sports Confederation (Confederação Brasileira de Desportos) as a successor of Copa Rio, that featured teams from Europe and South America. Torneo Octogonal had a similar format than its predecessor, being also held in Rio de Janeiro and São Paulo from 7 June to 4 July. Participant clubs were divided into two zones of four teams, playing each other once in a single round-robin tournament.

The tournament featured players such as Obdulio Varela, Roque Máspoli, Alcides Ghiggia, Juan Alberto Schiaffino of Peñarol, José Travassos of Sporting Lisbon, Didi, Joao Pinheiro of Fluminense, Luizinho, goalkeeper Gilmar of Corinthians and Roger Vonlanthen of Grasshopper.

The final was played in a two-legged format, contested by Brazilian teams Vasco da Gama and São Paulo. After beating São Paulo twice, Vasco won the series 4–0 on points, achieving their first Torneo Octogonal trophy.

The tournament was named after Rivadávia Corrêa Meyer, football executive and president of the "Confederação Brasileira de Desportos" (Brazilian Sports Confederation), a position he occupied from 1943 to 1955.

Participants 

Notes

 Spanish club Real Madrid (champion of the 1952 Small Club World Cup) withdrew from the competition.

Venues

Tournament course

Rio de Janeiro Group 

 7 June: Vasco da Gama 3–3 Hibernian
 13 June: Botafogo 3–1 Hibernian
 14 June: Vasco da Gama 2–1 Fluminense
 17 June: Botafogo 2–2 Fluminense
 20 June: Fluminense 3–0 Hibernian
 21 June: Vasco da Gama 2–1 Botafogo

São Paulo Group

 7 June: Corinthians 5–2 Olimpia
 13 June: São Paulo 4–1 Olimpia
 14 June: Corinthians 2–1 Sporting
 17 June: São Paulo 4–1 Sporting
 20 June: Olimpia 1–1 Sporting
 21 June: São Paulo 1–1 Corinthians

Semi-finals 
São Paulo
 24 June: São Paulo 1–0 Fluminense
 28 June: São Paulo 0–1 (1–0) Fluminense

Rio de Janeiro
 24 June: Vasco da Gama 4–2 Corinthians
 28 June: Vasco da Gama 3–1 Corinthians

Finals

Match details

See also 
 Copa Rio (international tournament)

References 

1953 in Brazilian football
r
r